East Stroudsburg Armory, also known as the Captain George M. Kemp Memorial Armory, is a historic National Guard armory located at East Stroudsburg, Monroe County, Pennsylvania.  It was built in 1928, and is a "T"-plan building consisting of a two-story administration building and attached one-story drill hall executed in the Tudor Revival style. It is constructed of brick and sits on a concrete foundation.  It measures approximately 56 feet by 128 feet. Since class warfare was no longer a concern, the function of the armory took a new turn, and armories were often used as community centers and for public gatherings. No longer were these facilities built to look intimidating; they were now designed in styles that were not visually associated with defense. Armories designed in the Art Deco and Moderne styles were now in vogue, mostly funded by the WPA to create jobs for both skilled and unskilled laborers during the Depression. The following list of architects, engineers and contractors was compiled from various sources including Robert M. Fogelson’s American’s Armories, State inventories and National Register of Historic Places Nominations. https://www.dot7.state.pa.us/CRGIS_Attachments/Survey/FINAL%20Historic%20Context%208Jun08%20(2).pdf

It was added to the National Register of Historic Places in 1991.

References

Armories on the National Register of Historic Places in Pennsylvania
Tudor Revival architecture in Pennsylvania
Infrastructure completed in 1928
Buildings and structures in Monroe County, Pennsylvania
East Stroudsburg, Pennsylvania
National Register of Historic Places in Monroe County, Pennsylvania